Empire, Inc. is a six-episode Canadian television miniseries, which aired on CBC Television in English and Télévision de Radio-Canada in French in 1983. Spanning from the 1920s to the 1960s, the series centred on the family of James Munroe (Kenneth Welsh), a wealthy anglophone business tycoon in Montreal.

The series was a co-production of CBC Television, Télévision de Radio-Canada and the National Film Board. It was directed by Douglas Jackson and Denys Arcand, with each directing three of the six episodes.

The cast also included Martha Henry, Jennifer Dale, Mitch Martin, Peter Dvorsky, Linda Griffiths, Pamela Redfern, Joseph Ziegler, Donald Pilon, Lyn Jackson and Gabriel Arcand.

The series garnered six ACTRA Award nominations in 1984, including Best Actor for Welsh, Best Actress for both Griffiths and Henry, Best Supporting Performer nods for Gabriel Arcand and Lyn Jackson and a Best Writing for Douglas Bowie. Welsh, Griffiths, Arcand and Bowie won their awards.

References

External links

1980s Canadian television miniseries
1980s Canadian drama television series
1983 Canadian television series debuts
1983 Canadian television series endings
CBC Television original programming
Ici Radio-Canada Télé original programming
Films directed by Denys Arcand
Films directed by Douglas Jackson